Waldo Rudolph Tobler (November 16, 1930 – February 20, 2018) was an American-Swiss geographer and cartographer. Tobler's idea that "Everything is related to everything else, but near things are more related than distant things"  is referred to as the "first law of geography." He proposed a second law as well: "The phenomenon external to an area of interest affects what goes on inside". Tobler was an active Professor Emeritus at the University of California, Santa Barbara Department of Geography until his death.

Academic background
In 1961, Tobler received his Ph.D. in the Department of Geography at the University of Washington at Seattle. At Washington, he participated in geography's William Garrison-led quantitative revolution of the late 1950s. After graduating in 1961, Tobler became an Assistant Professor at the University of Michigan, where he remained until moving to the University of California, Santa Barbara in 1977. Until his retirement he held the positions of Professor of Geography and Professor of Statistics at the University of California, Santa Barbara. The University of Zurich, Switzerland, awarded him an honorary doctorate in 1988.

Research
Tobler was one of the principal investigators and a senior scientist in the National Science Foundation-sponsored National Center for Geographic Information and Analysis. His career in geography had a profound impact on the discipline, and he is perhaps the most influential geographer of the past century. As a graduate student, he pioneered the use of computers in cartography in his 1959 paper "Automation and Cartography". This technology was extremely influential in early Geographic Information Systems. His later research emphasized mathematical modeling and graphic interpretations in geography. In the course of his research, he formulated the "first law of geography" in 1970 while producing a computer movie of Detroit. He is the inventor of novel and unusual map projections, among which was the first derivation of the partial differential equations for area cartograms. He also invented a method for smooth two-dimensional mass-preserving areal data redistribution. In 1989, the American Geographical Society awarded Tobler with the Osborn Maitland Miller Medal.

Tobler was involved in building a global, latitude-longitude oriented, demographic information base with resolution two orders of magnitude better than was previously available. He also examined the development of smooth finite element and categorical pycnophylactic geographic information reallocation models. In July 1999 he presented a keynote speech, "The World is Shriveling as it Shrinks," at the ESRI International User Conference, and was the recipient of a Lifetime Achievement Award in GIS by ESRI. Taylor and Francis of London recently published a map projection book, co-authored with Q. Yang of China and the late John P. Snyder. More recent interests related to ideas in computational geography including the analysis of geographical vector fields and the development of migration and of global trade models.

Tobler was also concerned with representing flow (due to its involvement with movement as a mechanism of geographic change). In 2003, Tobler released a freeware, Microsoft Windows-based version of his flow representation software Flow Mapper. In 2005, an ESRI ArcGIS version of the software, inspired by Tobler, was developed by Alan Glennon and Michael Goodchild at UCSB. Both versions are available from the Center for Spatially Integrated Social Science (http://vgi.spatial.ucsb.edu/clearinghouse/FlowMapper/)

Honors
Member of the National Academy of Sciences of the United States;
Honorary Fellow, American Geographical Society;
Osborn Maitland Miller Medal, American Geographical Society 1989;
Meritorious Contributor Medallion, Association of American Geographers, 1971;
Andrew McNally Award, 1986;
ESRI Lifetime Achievement Award, 1999.
AAG Microcomputer Specialty Award, 1993.
GIS Hall of Fame Inductee, URISA (Urban and Regional Information Systems Association), 2016.
Phi Beta Kappa, Sigma Xi, Phi Kappa Phi

Tobler served on the National Research Council the Board on Earth Sciences. He has been on the editorial board of several journals, including The American Cartographer, Journal of Regional Science, Geographical Analysis, and the International Journal of Geographical Information Systems. He was a charter member of the Urban and Regional Information Systems Association, a council member of the Regional Science Association, member and chairman of the Mathematical Social Science Board, and served as the United States delegate to the International Geographical Union Commission on Geographical Data Processing and Sensing. Until his retirement, he was a member of the Royal Geographical Society of Great Britain.

See also
Tobler's first law of geography
 Tobler's second law of geography
Tobler's hiking function
Tobler hyperelliptical projection

References
General
W. Tobler, (2002) “Ma Vie: Growing Up in America and Europe”, in Geographical Voices, W. Pitts and P. Gould, eds., University of Syracuse Press; Syracuse; pages 292–322.
In French: (2000) “Ma Vie: Grandir en Amérique et en Europe”, dans Mémoires de Géographes, P. Gould et A. Bailly, eds., Anthropos, Paris, 209–242.
Specific

External links
Waldo R. Tobler at UCSB
CSISS/Flow Mapper Software
UCSB Geography

Members of the United States National Academy of Sciences
American geographers
Swiss geographers
1930 births
2018 deaths
University of California, Santa Barbara faculty
University of Michigan faculty
Human geographers
University of Washington alumni
American cartographers
Geographic information scientists